The Animal Transportation Association (ATA) is a non-profit organization dedicated to the safe and humane transportation of animals worldwide. The organization advocates for uniform and effective international regulations for the humane handling of live animals, and involves members in finding solutions to a variety of problems related to the transport of animals. Members are linked to information, resources, contacts and key developments in the field to help them provide better services and conditions for animals in transit.

History
The organization was founded as the Animal Air Transportation Association in 1976 in response to the concerns of industry leaders, government officials, and humane association representatives about the safe and humane transportation of livestock, zoo animals and other animal requiring transportation. The name was changed to the current name in 1989, to emphasize that sea, air and land transport are of equal importance in the safe and humane transport of animals.

Membership
Members of the ATA include airlines, truckers, shipping firms, government agencies throughout the world, universities, research organizations, breeders, importers, exporters, veterinarians, and others interested in the transportation of live animals.

Policies
Members must adhere to the organization's statement of policies, which includes features like agreeing to engage in advocacy for "the establishment of an animal protection office at principal ports and terminals where live animals are handled", and agreeing that "our first consideration is the safe, humane, and expeditious handling of any animals under our care".

Annual conference
An annual conference is held to discuss animal transportation issues. The 2013 conference in Las Vegas, Nevada, discussed a variety of issues including risk management and emergency planning; hot and cold weather transport of animals; incorporating biosecurity into lab animal transport; and transporting police and military dogs.

References

See also
Livestock transportation
Animal transporter

External links
Official website

Animal welfare organizations